Defective may refer to::

Defective matrix, in algebra
Defective verb, in linguistics
Defective, or haser, in Hebrew orthography, a spelling variant that does not include mater lectionis
Something presenting an anomaly, such as a product defect, making it nonfunctional

See also
 Defect (disambiguation)